Virgil Zwicker, (born June 26, 1982), is an American professional mixed martial artist currently competing in the Heavyweight division. A professional competitor since 2003, Zwicker has formerly competed for Bellator MMA, Strikeforce and KSW.

Background
Zwicker grew up on the San Pasqual Indian Reservation in North County, San Diego, to a father who was a truck driver and a mother who worked hard to support Zwicker and his 11 other siblings. Zwicker's older brother was a Golden Gloves boxer and aided Zwicker in his fighting career. Zwicker belongs to the Kumeyaay-Ipai tribe and grew up in a poverty stricken environment. There weren't a lot of opportunities for Zwicker to play organized sports growing up, but he was a star football player in Pop Warner, known as a smaller player who hit very hard. With little supervision on the reservation, by the age of eleven Zwicker was routinely fighting grown men. It was also when he was eleven years old that he was arrested for the first time, in 1994. The arrest was for assaulting his school's vice principal and from then until 2005, Zwicker spent most of his time in and out of juvenile halls and prisons for various offenses, including assaulting a police officer. After spending over four years in prison for this offense, he returned a year later for knocking a man's eye out in a fight. He attended Orange Glen High School in Escondido, California.

Mixed martial arts career

Early career
Zwicker's first fight came when he was released from being incarcerated and took the fight on two weeks' notice. He defeated Denis Hall in under a minute via TKO. He then racked up a 9–1 record, defeating notables such as future UFC and Strikeforce competitor Ovince St. Preux.

Strikeforce
Zwicker signed with Strikeforce and fought Lavar Johnson at Strikeforce Challengers: Bowling vs. Voelker. However, Zwicker lost via first-round KO, after the two veterans exchanged wild punches.

Zwicker next fought against Brett Albee at Strikeforce: Diaz vs. Daley. He won the fight via TKO in the first round.

At Strikeforce: Barnett vs. Cormier, Zwicker faced Guto Inocente. He lost the fight via unanimous decision (29-28, 29-28, 30-27).

KSW
Zwicker faced Mike Hayes on December 7, 2013 at KSW 25. He won the fight via KO in the first round.

Bellator MMA
Zwicker signed a mult-fight contract with Bellator, facing Nick Moghadden on September 13, 2013 at Bellator 99. He won the fight by TKO in round one.

In his second fight for the promotion, Zwicker faced Linton Vassell at Bellator 122 on July 25, 2014. He lost the fight via submission in the first round.

Zwicker filled in for an injured James Thompson against UFC veteran Houston Alexander on October 17, 2014 at Bellator 129. The fight ended in a majority draw as Alexander was docked a point for repeated illegal headbutting.

A rematch with Alexander took place at Bellator 132 on January 16, 2015. Zwicker won the bout via split decision.

Zwicker faced former UFC competitor Razak Al-Hassan at Bellator 137 on May 15, 2015. He won the fight via knockout in the first round.

Zwicker next faced Brian Rogers on December 4, 2015 at Bellator 147. He lost the fight via submission in the second round.

Zwicker faced Dan Charles at Bellator 162 on October 21, 2016. He won the fight via TKO in the second round.

World Fighting Championship Akhmat
Zwicker signed three-fight deal with Chechen promotion World Fighting Championship Akhmat. Zwicker made his debut for the organisation on May 21, 2017 in Grozny, Chechnya

Kickboxing
Zwicker debuted as a Muay Thai kickboxer in the main event of WCK Muay Thai: Bad to the Bone in Temecula, California on April 6, 2013, losing to Sergio Piqué via split decision. He will rematch Piqué at WCK Muay Thai: Matter of Pride in Temecula, California, US on February 15, 2014.

Personal life
On Christmas Eve of 2013, Zwicker was stabbed in an attempted carjacking, but was able to fend off the three assailants attempting to take his car and was not wounded fatally.

On July 10, 2019 Zwicker was arraigned on charges of sexual assault of a minor and plead not guilty. In all, Zwicker was charged with resisting arrest, possession of a controlled substance, illegal possession of a firearm, aggravated sexual assault on a minor and lewd acts on a child.

It was reported by San Diego County police that Zwicker has been involved in 10 legal cases between 2003 and 2014.

Kickboxing record

|-
|-  bgcolor="#FFBBBB"
| 2016-01-09 || Loss ||align=left| Xiu Pengcheng || Kunlun Fight 36 || Shanghai Oriental Sports Center, China || KO || 2 ||  || 0-2
|-
|-  bgcolor="#FFBBBB"
| 2013-04-06 || Loss ||align=left| Sergio Piqué || WCK Muay Thai: Bad to the Bone || Temecula, California, USA || Decision (split) || 5 || 3:00 || 0-1
|-
|-
| colspan=9 | Legend:

Championships and accomplishments
Konfrontacja Sztuk Walki
Fight of the Night (One time)

Mixed martial arts record

|Win
|align=center|17–8–1
|Attila Végh
|KO (punches)
|Oktagon 12
|
|align=center|1
|align=center|3:18
|Bratislava, Slovakia
|
|-
|Loss
|align=center|16–8–1
|Alexander Romanov
|Submission (neck crank)
|S-70: Plotforma Cup 2018
|
|align=center|1
|align=center|1:15
|Sochi, Russia
|
|-
|Loss
|align=center|16–7–1
| Aleksander Emelianenko
| TKO (punches)
| World Fighting Championship Akhmat 44
| 
| align=center|1 
| align=center|3:03 
| Grozny, Russia
| 
|-
|Win
|align=center|16–6–1
|Nikoley Rachek
|KO (punches)
|Plotforma S-70 8th
|
|align=center|1
|align=center|0:15
|Sochi, Russia
|
|-
|Loss
|align=center|15–6–1
|Zelimkhan Umiev
|Submission (kimura)
|World Fighting Championship Akhmat 38
|
|align=center|1
|align=center|1:14
|Grozny, Chechnya, Russia
|
|-
|Win
|align=center|15–5–1
|Dan Charles
|TKO (punches)
|Bellator 162
|
|align=center|2
|align=center|4:31
|Memphis, Tennessee, United States
|Return to Heavyweight.
|-
|Loss
|align=center|14–5–1
|Brian Rogers
|Submission (arm-triangle choke)
|Bellator 147
|
|align=center|2
|align=center|4:38
|San Jose, California, United States
|
|-
| Win
| align=center| 14–4–1
| Razak Al-Hassan
| KO (punch)
| Bellator 137
| 
| align=center| 1
| align=center| 3:51
| Temecula, California, United States
|Catchweight bout of 206 lbs.
|-
| Win
| align=center| 13–4–1
| Houston Alexander
| Decision (split)
| Bellator 132
| 
| align=center| 3
| align=center| 5:00
| Temecula, California, United States
| 
|-
| Draw
| align=center| 12–4–1
| Houston Alexander
| Draw (majority)
| Bellator 129
| 
| align=center| 3
| align=center| 5:00
| Council Bluffs, Iowa, United States
| Catchweight bout of 215 lbs.
|-
| Loss
| align=center| 12–4
| Linton Vassell
| Submission (rear-naked choke)
| Bellator 122
| 
| align=center| 1
| align=center| 1:07
| Temecula, California, United States
| 
|-
| Win
| align=center| 12–3
| Mike Hayes
| KO (punch)
| KSW 25: Khalidov vs. Sakurai
| 
| align=center| 1
| align=center| 1:12
| Wroclaw, Poland
| 
|-
| Win
| align=center| 11–3
| Nick Moghadden
| TKO (punches)
| Bellator 99
| 
| align=center| 1
| align=center| 3:22
| Temecula, California, United States
| 
|-
| Loss
| align=center| 10–3
| Guto Inocente
| Decision (unanimous)
| Strikeforce: Barnett vs. Cormier
| 
| align=center| 3
| align=center| 5:00
| San Jose, California, United States
|Return to Light Heavyweight.
|-
| Win
| align=center| 10–2
| Brett Albee
| TKO (punches)
| Strikeforce: Diaz vs. Daley
| 
| align=center| 1
| align=center| 1:46
| San Diego, California, United States
| 
|-
| Loss
| align=center| 9–2
| Lavar Johnson
| KO (punches)
| Strikeforce Challengers: Bowling vs. Voelker
| 
| align=center| 1
| align=center| 2:17
| Fresno, California, United States
| 
|-
| Win
| align=center| 9–1
| Eddie Sapp
| Submission (rear-naked choke)
| Native Fighting Championship 6
| 
| align=center| 1
| align=center| 2:01
| Campo, California, United States
|
|-
| Loss
| align=center| 8–1
| Cody Goodale
| Decision (unanimous)
| Gladiator Challenge: Maximum Force
| 
| align=center| 3
| align=center| 5:00
| San Jacinto, California, United States
|Return to Heavyweight.
|-
| Win
| align=center| 8–0
| Ovince Saint Preux
| TKO (punches)
| Top Combat Championship 1
| 
| align=center| 2
| align=center| 0:46
| San Juan, Puerto Rico
|Light Heavyweight debut.
|-
| Win
| align=center| 7–0
| William Richey
| Decision (unanimous)
| Called Out MMA 1
| 
| align=center| 3
| align=center| 5:00
| Ontario, California, United States
| 
|-
| Win
| align=center| 6–0
| Buckley Acosta
| TKO (punches)
| Gladiator Challenge: Venom
| 
| align=center| 1
| align=center| 2:59
| Pauma Valley, California, United States
| 
|-
| Win
| align=center| 5–0
| Dave Diaz
| Submission
| GC 85: Cross Fire
| 
| align=center| 1
| align=center| 1:41
| San Diego, California, United States
| 
|-
| Win
| align=center| 4–0
| Abraham Ramirez
| TKO (punches)
| Apocalypse Fights 1
| 
| align=center| 1
| align=center| N/A
| Alabama, United States
| 
|-
| Win
| align=center| 3–0
| Ty Montgomery
| TKO (punches)
| Galaxy Productions
| 
| align=center| 1
| align=center| 0:41
| California, United States
| 
|-
| Win
| align=center| 2–0
| Tom Hubert
| TKO (doctor stoppage)
| Total Combat 10
| 
| align=center| 2
| align=center| 1:54
| San Diego, California, United States
| 
|-
| Win
| align=center| 1–0
| Denis Hall
| TKO (punches)
| CFF: Cobra Classic 9
| 
| align=center| 1
| align=center| 0:58
| Anza, California, United States
|

See also

 List of male mixed martial artists

References

External links

Living people
1982 births
American male mixed martial artists
Heavyweight mixed martial artists
American male kickboxers
Heavyweight kickboxers
Native American sportspeople
People of Kumeyaay descent
Sportspeople from Temecula, California